The site of Ebsbury, in Wiltshire, England, includes the remains of an Iron Age enclosed settlement, field system and possible hill fort, and a Romano-British enclosed settlement.

To the north and east sides of the site the contours of the hill have been reinforced by several banks. The site of an Iron Age settlement lies to the eastern end of the site.

The site was subject to archaeological surveys and excavations in 1906 by S.W. Doughty. Finds include a Neolithic perforated mace-head and two Roman coin hoards. The latter were found buried in two earthenware pots; the coins date from between AD 337 and AD 408, and were found with the remains of a glass vessel, and six silver rings.

Location 
About  to the west, in the River Wylye valley, lies the village of Great Wishford. The hill has a summit of  AOD. Nearby to the north lies the Iron Age site called Grovely Castle, and to the south, the largest forest in Wiltshire, Grovely Wood.

References

See also 
 List of hill forts in England

Iron Age sites in England
Buildings and structures in Wiltshire
Hill forts in Wiltshire
Archaeological sites in Wiltshire